Gwendal Rouillard (born 20 April 1976) is a French politician of La République En Marche! (LREM) (from 2017) who served as a member of the French National Assembly from 2011 (originally as socialist) to 2022, representing the department of Morbihan.

Political career
In parliament, Roullard served on the Defence Committee since 2011. In addition to his committee assignments, he chaired the French-Sudanese Parliamentary Friendship Group and was part of the parliamentary working group on Libya.

In July 2019, Rouillard voted in favour of the French ratification of the European Union’s Comprehensive Economic and Trade Agreement (CETA) with Canada.

See also
 2017 French legislative election

References

1976 births
Living people
Deputies of the 14th National Assembly of the French Fifth Republic
Deputies of the 15th National Assembly of the French Fifth Republic
La République En Marche! politicians
Place of birth missing (living people)